The 2008 British Formula Ford Championship was the 33rd edition of the British Formula Ford Championship. It began on 24 March at Oulton Park's Easter Monday meeting and ended on 12 October at Donington Park after 10 rounds and 25 races, held in the United Kingdom and Belgium. Having won 13 of the first 18 races, Jamun Mygale driver Wayne Boyd looked set to be a runaway championship winner, although in the end, Boyd's championship winning margin over teammate Tim Blanchard was 50 points.

Drivers and teams

Race calendar and results

Championship standings
Points are awarded to the drivers as follows:

Best 23 scores must be dropped towards the championship.
 T. Pts — points if all races counted.
 Drop — two dropped scores.
 Pts — best 23 scores.
 S. Pts — Scholarship championship points, best 23 scores.

† - Matt Hamilton, James Cole and Alex Jones docked six points for dangerous driving; Glen Wood docked twelve points for the same reason.

References

External links
 The home of the British Formula Ford Championship

British Formula Ford Championship seasons
Formula Ford Championship
British Formula Ford